"Crazy Something Normal" is a single by Donkeyboy, a pop band from Drammen, Norway. The single was released on 24 March 2014. The song features a radio speech vocals and choir vocals. The song reached no. 13 on the Norwegian Single Charts.

Track listings

Chart performance

Weekly charts

Release history

References

2014 songs
Donkeyboy songs
2014 singles
Songs written by Kiesza
Warner Music Group singles
Songs written by Cato Sundberg